The Ice Theatre of New York is a professional ensemble company dancing on ice, performing works by choreographers drawn from competitive figure skating and modern and contemporary dance. Aiming to create dance on ice as part of the modern performing arts scene, Ice Theatre of New York (ITNY) was first conceived by Marc Bogaerts, Marjorie Kouns, Cecily Morrow and Moira North. Moira North went on to found ITNY in 1984. North, a Canadian-born skater was twice named one of the 25 most influential names in figure skating by International Figure Skating Magazine. Based at the Chelsea Piers rink complex in New York City, Ice Theatre of New York was the first not-for-profit professional ice dance company in the U.S. and the first to receive funding from the National Endowment for the Arts, New York State Council on the Arts, and New York City Department of Cultural Affairs. Italian ice dancer, choreographer and aerialist, Elisa Angeli, is Ice Theatre of New York’s Ensemble Director.

Ice Theatre of New York has performed works by choreographers such as Marc Bogaerts, Edward Villella, Jacqulyn Buglisi, Alberto del Saz, Carlos Orta, Twyla Tharp, Jean-Pierre Bonnefoux, Peter Martins, Lar Lubovitch, Elisa Monte, Susan Marshall, Joanna Mendl Shaw, Tommy Steenberg, Frank Nowosad, David Dorfman, Bill Woehrle, Rob McBrien, Nathan Madden, Jim May, Gary Beacom, Peter DiFalco, Charles “Chucky” Klapow, Matthew Nash, Judy Blumberg, Gaiane & Akop Akopian, Lorna Brown and Florentine Houdinière.

The company has supported emerging choreographers including Beth Woronoff, Joel Dear, Elladj Baldé, Eliot Jon Halverson, Elisa Angeli (who also serves as the Ensemble Director), Line Haddad, Alyssa Stith, David Liu, Heather Harrington, Katherine Healy, and Douglas Webster. Performance artists Ann Carlson and Greg Wittrock have also choreographed for Ice Theatre of New York. Several emerging choreographers Ice Theatre of New York supported have gone on to form their own companies.

The Ice Theatre of New York ensemble consists of 8 to 12 skaters from the NY area. They perform solos, duets and group repertory pieces. The company has created close to 100 repertory pieces to date. Guest artists who performed with the company include Elladj Baldé, Gary Beacom, Surya Bonaly, Kurt Browning, John Curry, Dorothy Hamill, Sarah Hughes, Nancy Kerrigan, Kiira Korpi, Ross Miner, Tatiana Navka & Roman Kostomarov, Evgeni Plushenko, Adam Rippon, Lucinda Ruh, Rohene Ward, Johnny Weir, and Paul Wylie.

Ice Theatre of New York has garnered ongoing private support from the Lisa McGraw Figure Skating Foundation, Bloomberg Philanthropies, the Will Sears Memorial Fund, the Kasputys family, the Eagan Family Foundation, and many individuals from the skating community, who are energized by Ice Theatre’s annual Gala honoring key figures such as Dick Button, Dorothy Hamill, Tenley Albright, Belita, Ludmila Belousova & Oleg Protopopov, Barbara Ann Scott, Sasha Cohen, Evan Lysacek, Tai Babilonia & Randy Gardner, JoJo Starbuck & Ken Shelley, Johnny Weir, and others. Performances have been favorably reviewed in major media.

Weekly during the season, the Ice Theatre of New York ensemble gathers for Choreography Labs where they work with established and emerging choreographers. As funds permit, ITNY arranges two-week residencies in other cities where ice rental is less expensive, such as Lake Placid, NY, or Sun Valley, ID, in order to develop new choreography and the dance artistry and athleticism of the ensemble.

Aerial artists such as Elisa Angeli, Joel Dear, and Sally Jeanne Watkins have combined dancing on ice with circus arts in spectacular Ice Theatre of New York performances.

In a format developed by Olympic Champion John Curry as a class for his skating company, skaters in the group’s weekly Master Edge Class focus on ensemble movement to music. This class functions much like the ballet barre in Ballet. In service to the community of skaters, this class is free to all adult skaters. Junior skaters are provided twice weekly summer classes.

Ice Theatre of New York’s educational outreach extends to New York City public school children, K-12. Their New Works and Young Artists Series gives arts exposure to students from neighborhoods in Upper Manhattan and the outer boroughs. Students view a performance that includes the professional company and several junior skaters followed by a one hour ice skating lesson. Programming takes place at several public rinks around the city, for a total of 10-12 sessions for 2,600-plus students.

The company provides ticketed home season performances at Chelsea Piers Sky Rink each year as well as free performances at Rockefeller Center and Riverbank State Park (Harlem); and other venues.

Ice Theatre of New York is available for performances at special events at the area rinks or in event spaces on a synthetic ice surface, which the company owns and can easily be installed in under an hour.

External links
 Ice Theatre of New York web site

References

Dance companies in New York City
Ice shows
Figure skating in the United States